Earnest Lloyd Trammell (born January 31, 1953), is an American inventor in the field of dimensional sound processing.  Most known for selling the first working surround sound to Hughes Aircraft and working on the Peavey KOSMOS processors, Lloyd was also featured in an Electronic Musician Magazine article on sound design.

History
In 2001, the KOSMOS debuts and is praised by top studio producers such as Kevin Shirley, who uses it to recreate the live sound of Jimmy Page's guitars on the hugely successful live Led Zeppelin DVD and Led Zeppelin: How the West Was Won releases.

Lloyd Trammell, Elon Ray Coats and Michael V. Powers filed for a patent on "Acoustic modeling apparatus and method" on September 3, 2002.  They were awarded patent 6,627,808 on September 30, 2003.  The invention enables an electric guitar to sound like an acoustic guitar.  The invention has a bridge sensor and a body sensor.  The bridge sensor is used to sense string vibrations and a body sensor is used to sense the resonance of the string vibrations.  A summing circuit adds the amplified body reasonance signal to the amplified bridge signal to produce an output signal that sounds like an acoustic instrument.

Lloyd Trammell and Elon Ray Coats filed for a patent on "Sub-harmonic generator and stereo expansion processor" on February 8, 2005.  They were awarded patent 7,203,320 on April 10, 2007.  The invention filters an input signal to produce an intermediate signal which is then used to cancel energy in the output signal.

Lloyd Trammell and Elon Ray Coats filed for a patent on "Methods and apparatus for sub-harmonic generation, stereo expansion" on October 4, 2004.  They were awarded patent 7,171,002 on January 30, 2007.  The invention filters an input signal to produce an intermediate signal which is then used to cancel energy in the output signal.

Peavey Electronics Corporation, developed a sub-harmonic generator, called KOSMOS, based on patent 7,171,002 that avoids flat, cardboard sounding characteristics common to this type of process. The KOSMOS system achieves this by modifying frequency components at least partially outside the sub-harmonic range, and using the amplitude envelope of the input signal (as a function of frequency components in the relevant frequency range) in producing the output signal. The KOSMOS system also increases stereo width characteristics created by signals from left and right channels and improves sound clarity above certain frequencies.

In 2003, Lloyd Trammell was quoted in a review of the Peavey Kosmos Pro in Mix Magazine explaining the unique characteristics of his invention.

Frank Serafine, whose credits as a film score composer and sound designer include Tron, The Hunt for Red October, Star Trek—The Movie, Star Trek—The Search For Spock and Field of Dreams, has been using the Peavey Kosmos to add definition and clarity to the low end of his surround-sound mixes. The Peavey Kosmos is a low-frequency energy and stereo image enhancement system that produces deep low end while adding clarity and definition to any audio source.

Always on the lookout for cutting-edge digital and analog signal processing products, Serafine notes, "The Kosmos Pro is the best and most versatile tool for sub-harmonic frequency generation that I've come across in my 22 years in the sound design business. It gives me a great deal of control over my mixes and removes a lot of the EQ'ing I used to have to do."

Patents
Lloyd Trammell has been awarded eight patents for advancements in audio technology:
 7,136,493 for [http://patft.uspto.gov/netacgi/nph-Parser?Sect1=PTO1&Sect2=HITOFF&d=PALL&p=1&u=%2Fnetahtml%2FPTO%2Fsrchnum.htm&r=1&f=G&l=50&s1=7,136,493.PN.&OS=PN/7,136,493&RS=PN/7,136,493 "Sub-harmonic generator and stereo expansion processor" 
 6,627,808 for "Acoustic modeling apparatus and method"" [https://patents.google.com/patent/US6627808B1/en?oq=6%2c627%2c808PDF 
 7,203,320 for [https://patents.google.com/patent/US7203320B2/en?oq=+7%2c203%2c320 "Sub-harmonic generator and stereo expansion processor"" 
 7,171,002 for [https://patents.google.com/patent/US7171002B2/en?oq=US7171002B2 "Methods and apparatus for sub-harmonic generation, stereo expansion"" 
 7,242,779 for [https://patents.google.com/patent/US7242779B2/en?oq=7242779 "Methods and apparatus for sub-harmonic generation, stereo expansion and distortion"" 
 9,300,262 for "Audio processing application for Windows"
 US9679427B2 for "Biometric Audio Security" https://patents.google.com/patent/US9679427B2/en
 US20180270574 for “Dynamic Audio Enhancement Using an All-Pass Filter” https://patentscope.wipo.int/search/en/detail.jsf;jsessionid=F65866E40A4679F44282F2FD6A9B7E7D.wapp2nA?docId=US226141785&recNum=4303&office=&queryString=&prevFilter=&sortOption=Pub+Date+Desc&maxRec=70962897

Notes

References
 Coats, Elon Ray and Trammell, Earnest Lloyd (2007). Sub-harmonic generator and Stereo Expansion Processor. United States Patent #7,203,320  
 Coats, Elon Ray and Trammell, Earnest Lloyd (2007). Methods and apparatus for sub-harmonic generation, stereo expansion and distortion. United States Patent #7,171,002 , Jan. 30, 2007
 Coats, Elon Ray and Trammell, Earnest Lloyd (2006). Sub-harmonic generator and Stereo Expansion Processor. United States Patent #7,136,493 
 Barry Rudolph (Dec 1, 2003).  Field Test: Peavey Kosmos Pro.  MIX Magazine. 
 Coats, Elon Ray, Trammell, Earnest Lloyd and Powers, Michael V. (2003). Acoustic modeling apparatus and method. United States Patent #6,627,808 
 Michael Cooper (Apr 12, 2002). "Peavey Kosmos Review" . Electronic Musician Magazine. 
 Mike Cameron (Apr 2003) . "Peavey Kosmos" . Sound on Sound Magazine . 
 Andrew Roberts (Nov 20040 . "Peavey Kosmos Pro Review" . Pro Audio Review Magazine. 

1953 births
Living people
21st-century American inventors